

L

L